The United Fighting Arts Federation (UFAF) is a martial arts organization founded by Chuck Norris in 1979. UFAF is the governing and sanctioning body for the Chuck Norris System, a martial art Norris developed from Tang Soo Do, and which was known as the Chuck Norris System in the early to mid 1980s and as Chun Kuk Do from December 1990 until July 2015. UFAF provides technical standards for instruction and advancement in the system, and also provides its students, instructors, and schools with Chuck Norris System rank certification, educational opportunities, special events, online community access, and other services.

Organizational structure
Like many organizations, UFAF includes an executive board and a board of directors.

Executives
Chuck Norris, 10th degree black belt – Founder, Chairman of the Board
Aaron Norris, 10th degree black belt – Chief executive officer
Ken Gallacher, 10th degree black belt - President
Board of Directors
Ed Saenz, 9th degree black belt
Rick Prieto, 9th degree black belt
Chip Wright, 9th degree black belt
John Presti, 9th degree black belt
Tara Cox, 8th degree black belt

UFAF is also further divided into several regions across the United States, Canada, and Mexico. International locations and members are also included among the following regions:

Region 1 – Southern California USA
Region 2 – Great Basin USA (Including satellites in Colorado, Nebraska, and Norway)
Region 3 – Northwest USA
Region 4 – Texas USA, excluding KICKSTART KIDS schools (see Region 13)
Region 5 – Southwest USA
Region 6 – Appalachia West USA (Schools in Western West Virginia, Ohio, Kentucky)
Region 7 – Southeast USA
Region 8 – Northeast USA
Region 9 – Mexico Baja (Including satellites in South America)
Region 10 – Northern Mexico
Region 11 – Appalachia East USA (Schools in Eastern West Virginia, Virginia)
Region 12 – Mexico City area
Region 13 – Texas KICKSTART (KICKSTART KIDS Schools in Texas)

Events
Each summer the United Fighting Arts Federation holds a training conference and Chuck Norris System World Championship tournament in Las Vegas, Nevada.

References

External links
 
 Official Site for Chuck Norris' non-profit KICKSTART Foundation

1979 establishments in the United States
Chuck Norris
Karate organizations
Organizations based in Nevada